Hogg Middle School or Hogg Junior High School refers to:
 James S. Hogg Middle School - Houston, Texas - Houston Independent School District
 James S. Hogg Middle School - Tyler, Texas - Tyler Independent School District